The 2016 Campeonato Catarinense is the 93rd season of Santa Catarina's top professional football league. The competition began in January and will end in May.

Format
First stage
 All ten teams play a round-robin playing once against each other team.
 The best team in this stage qualifies to the Final Stage.

Second stage
 All ten teams play a round-robin playing once against each other team.
 The best team in this stage qualifies to the Final Stage.

Semifinal stage
 The two teams that won the first and the second stage are joined by the two best teams in the overall standings. 
 Home-and-away playoffs between the teams.

Finals
 Home-and-away playoffs between the winners of the first and second stages.
 The winner of the Finals is crowned champion.

Relegation
 The two worst teams in the overall standings are relegated to the second division of Campeonato Catarinense.

Teams

First phase

League table

References

Campeonato Catarinense seasons
Catarinense